Gary Jay Gubner (born December 1, 1942) is an American retired heavyweight weightlifter, shot putter and discus thrower. He had his best results in weightlifting, winning two world championship medals in 1962 and 1965 and placing fourth at the 1964 Summer Olympics. He also attempted to qualify for the 1964 Olympics in throwing events, and finished fifth in the shot put at the U.S. Olympic trials. Gubner set several shot put records, including a 53-foot throw with a 16-lb. ball when he was 16, and three world indoor records in 1962. His best result of 19.80 m placed him second in the 1962 world ranking.

Gubner won gold medals at the 1961 Maccabiah Games in Israel in heavyweight weightlifting, shotput, and discus. He won the shot put with a 60-foot, 1-1/4 inch (18.32 meter) throw.

Inducted into the National Jewish Sports Hall of Fame and Museum, Gubner has also been recognized by the International Jewish Sports Hall of Fame in its 2000 book Jewish Sports Legends.

See also
List of select Jewish track and field athletes
List of select Jewish weightlifters

References

External links
 

1942 births
Living people
American male shot putters
American male weightlifters
American male discus throwers
Olympic weightlifters of the United States
Weightlifters at the 1964 Summer Olympics
Jewish weightlifters
Jewish male athletes (track and field)
New York University alumni
Track and field athletes from New York City
21st-century American Jews
Maccabiah Games gold medalists for the United States
Maccabiah Games medalists in athletics
Competitors at the 1961 Maccabiah Games